Purkersdorf is a municipality in the district of Sankt Pölten-Land District, in the Austrian state of Lower Austria. The Sandstein-Wienerwald natural park, a part of the Vienna Woods, is situated on its territory. The municipality belonged to Wien-Umgebung District which was dissolved at the end of 2016.

Population

Twin towns
Purkersdorf is twinned with:

  Bad Säckingen, Germany
  Sanary-sur-Mer, France
  Göstling an der Ybbs, Austria

Personalities
It is the birthplace of economist Gottfried Haberler. Eric Burdon gave a free concert there on 12 June 2010.

References

Cities and towns in St. Pölten-Land District
Cadastral community of St. Pölten District